Control Freaks was a weekly video game review television show which was broadcast at 12:30pm on Sundays on the Seven Network in Australia. It was made in Adelaide, South Australia, by the digital media production company Brave Vision Pty Ltd, founded by Brett Howe and David Nye. Control Freaks was first broadcast in 2001. The program was cancelled by Seven in 2003 after two years on air. Two DVDs were released in Australia and New Zealand, just after the show went to air.

Overview 
After Australian distribution ended, Brave Vision launched control-freaks.tv. Online video streaming was still new in 2002, but Control Freaks was one of the world's major streaming games TV services, syndicated to over 100 affiliated websites across the globe.

The show continued to be broadcast on the international market, with a 26 part series in 2003/04, and a 52 part series in 2006/07. The team at Brave Vision made a total of 98 episodes of Control Freaks for cable, satellite, free-to-air and online distribution, distributed internationally by Worldwide Entertainment and Sportsbrand International.  Brave Vision still produces games-related content for the video games industry, whilst also taking a more immersive role in the sector, providing marketing, product management and PR services in Australia and abroad.

The production company has gone on to produce several international TV series and specials, including Hero 2 Zero for Worldwide Entertainment, Ultimate Gadgets for Virgin TV in the UK, Hotrods & Mean Machines for the Beyond Group, Cultural Flavours, a high definition cooking show, and CC Classic Cars, an HD 13 part series about classic cars, filmed in South Australia.

External links 
Video

Australian non-fiction television series